Dave Needham may refer to:

 David Needham (born 1949), English former footballer
 Dave Needham (boxer) (1951–2008), British boxer